The International Journal of STD & AIDS is a monthly peer-reviewed medical journal that covers the field of immunology as applied to sexually-transmitted diseases and HIV/AIDS. Its editor-in-chief is John White (Guy's and St Thomas' NHS Foundation Trust). It was established in 1990 and is published by SAGE Publications.

Abstracting and indexing 
The journal is abstracted and indexed in Index Medicus/PubMed/MEDLINE and the Science Citation Index Expanded. According to the Journal Citation Reports, its 2012 impact factor is 1.000, ranking it 62nd out of 69 journals in the category "Infectious Diseases" and 122nd out of 135 journals in the category "Immunology".

References

External links 
 

SAGE Publishing academic journals
English-language journals
Publications established in 1990
Monthly journals
HIV/AIDS journals
Immunology journals